3-Methylcrotonyl-CoA carboxylase deficiency also known as 3-Methylcrotonylglycinuria or BMCC deficiency is an inherited disorder in which the body is unable to process certain proteins properly. People with this disorder have inadequate levels of an enzyme that helps break down proteins containing the amino acid leucine. This condition affects an estimated 1 in 50,000 individuals worldwide.

Presentation
Infants with this disorder appear normal at birth but usually develop signs and symptoms during the first year of life or in early childhood. The characteristic features of this condition, which can range from mild to life-threatening, include feeding difficulties, recurrent episodes of vomiting and diarrhea, excessive tiredness (lethargy), and weak muscle tone (hypotonia). If untreated, this disorder can lead to delayed development, seizures, and coma. Early detection and lifelong management (following a low-protein diet and using appropriate supplements) may prevent many of these complications. In some cases, people with gene mutations that cause 3-methylcrotonyl-CoA carboxylase deficiency never experience any signs or symptoms of the disorder.

The characteristic features of this condition are similar to those of Reye syndrome, a severe disorder that develops in children while they appear to be recovering from viral infections such as chicken pox or flu. Most cases of Reye syndrome are associated with the use of aspirin during these viral infections.

Genetics
The MCCC1 and MCCC2 genes make protein subunits that come together to form an enzyme called 3-methylcrotonyl-CoA carboxylase. This enzyme plays an essential role in breaking down proteins from the diet. Specifically, the enzyme is responsible for the fourth step in processing leucine. If a mutation in the MCCC1 or MCCC2 gene reduces or eliminates the activity of 3-methylcrotonyl-CoA carboxylase, the body is unable to process leucine properly. As a result, toxic byproducts of leucine processing build up to harmful levels, damaging the brain and nervous system. This condition is inherited in an autosomal recessive pattern.

Screening
It is one of the 29 conditions currently recommended for newborn screening by the American College of Medical Genetics.

Treatment

Symptoms can be reduced through avoidance of leucine, an amino acid. Leucine is a component of most protein-rich foods; therefore, a low-protein diet is recommended. Some isolated cases of this disorder have responded to supplemental biotin; this is not altogether surprising, consider that other biotin-related genetic disorders (such as biotinidase deficiency and holocarboxylase synthetase deficiency) can be treated solely with biotin. Individuals with these multiple carboxylase disorders have the same problem with leucine catabolism as those with 3-methylcrotonyl-CoA carboxylase deficiency.

References
This article incorporates public domain text from The U.S. National Library of Medicine

External links 

 

Amino acid metabolism disorders
Autosomal recessive disorders